Stéphane Vossart (born 27 June 1972 in Croix, Nord) is a retired male breaststroke swimmer from France, who represented his native country at the 1992 Summer Olympics. His best result in three starts in Barcelona, Spain was the 5th place (3:40.51) in the Men's 4×100 metres Medley Relay event, alongside Franck Schott, Bruno Gutzeit and Stéphan Caron.

References
 sports-reference

1972 births
Living people
French male breaststroke swimmers
Olympic swimmers of France
Swimmers at the 1992 Summer Olympics
People from Croix, Nord
Sportspeople from Nord (French department)